Veniamin Fyodorovich Yakovlev (12 February 1932 – 24 July 2018) was a Soviet and Russian jurist. He was the first and only Chairman of the Supreme Court of Arbitration of the USSR and later became the first Chairman of the Supreme Court of Arbitration of Russia. He also served as the Soviet Minister of Justice from 1989 to 1990 and as the legal adviser to both Vladimir Putin and Dmitry Medvedev from 2005 till his death in 2018.

In 2022, the Ural State Law University, which Yakovlev graduated from in 1953, was named in his honor.

Honours and awards 
 Order "For Merit to the Fatherland", IV class (2012)
 Badge of the Council of Judges of the Russian Federation "For Service to Justice" (2012)
 Russian Federation Presidential Certificate of Honour (2008)
 Order of Holy Prince Daniel of Moscow, II class (2007)
 Honorary Citizen of Sverdlovsk Oblast (2007)
 Order "For Merit to the Fatherland", I class (2005)
 Honorary Civil Order of the Golden Cross "For Service to Society" (2004)
 Order "For Merit to the Fatherland", II class (2002)
 Order "For Merit to the Fatherland", III class (1997)
 Medal "In Commemoration of the 850th Anniversary of Moscow" (1997)
 Anatoly Koni Medal (1996)
 Merited Jurist of the Russian Federation (1982)

References 

1932 births
2018 deaths
Ural State Law University alumni
People from Kurgan Oblast
Russian jurists
Soviet jurists
21st-century jurists
Soviet Ministers of Justice
Central Committee of the Communist Party of the Soviet Union members
Advisers to the President of Russia
Full Cavaliers of the Order "For Merit to the Fatherland"
Academic staff of the Moscow State Institute of International Relations